Guadalupe Hayes-Mota is a biotechnologist, the CEO of Healr Solutions, a Lecturer at MIT and a Massachusetts Rare Disease Advisory Council Member.

Career 
Hayes-Mota grew up in Mexico and was diagnosed with hemophilia at birth. He has a BS in Chemistry, BS in Spanish Literature, MS in Systems Engineering and an MBA from MIT.  He holds a Master of Public Policy from Georgetown University and a Master of Public Administration from Harvard, where he was a fellow at the Center for Public Leadership. He conducted drug delivery research at the lab of Robert S. Langer and was elected to Sigma Xi. Also, Hayes-Mota ran a free healthcare system of clinics at UCLA Health. Early in his career, Hayes-Mota was a analyst at the RAND Corporation working in the Affordable Care Act.

He is the current CEO and founder of Healr Solutions. Hayes-Mota led as Director of Global Supply Chain and Manufacturing at Ultragenyx Pharmaceutical. Previously, at Biogen, Amgen and GSK he directed the manufacturing and distribution of 13 medications to 93 countries.

In 2021, Hayes-Mota was appointed to the Massachusetts Rare Disease Advisory Council by Governor Charlie Baker to advise the House of Representatives, Governor, Senate, and Department of Public Health on rare disease policy in Massachusetts.

He is Practitioner in Residence and Lecturer at the Massachusetts Institute of Technology. He served on the board of directors of the MIT LBGTQ+ Alumni Association, which he refounded and led as President. Hayes-Mota also is on the board of Fenway Health, Save One Life, and the MIT Alumni Association and is in the Forbes Business Council.

Personal life 
Hayes- Mota in 2012, finished 1st place (25 – 29 M) in the Death Valley half marathon. He is bisexual and married to Nicholas Hayes-Mota.

Awards and recognitions 

 Business Insider recognized Hayes-Mota as one of six powerful LGBTQ+ executives to have on corporate boards.
 Named as one of the 100 Most Inspiring People by PharmaVoice in the Life Science Industry.
 Top LGBT Leader by Endpoints News. 
 Named Boston Business Journal 40 under 40.
 Won MIT’s Margaret L. A MacVicar Award.

References 

American biotechnologists
MIT School of Humanities, Arts, and Social Sciences alumni
McCourt School of Public Policy alumni
Year of birth missing (living people)
Living people
Harvard Kennedy School alumni
MIT Sloan School of Management alumni
MIT School of Engineering alumni